The First  Weeks is a 1998 American erotic romantic drama film written and directed by Alex Wright and starring Paul Mercurio, Clara Bellar and Malcolm McDowell. It is a prequel to the films  Weeks and Love in Paris.

Plot
A banker goes to Louisiana to land a deal with an eccentric billionaire but instead gets involved with the millionaire's wife, Mardi Gras, and a sinister cult.

Cast

 Paul Mercurio as Matt Wade
 Clara Bellar as Emily Dubois
 Malcolm McDowell as Francois Dubois
 Frederic Forrest as David Millman
 Anna Jacyszyn as Robin Millman
 William Keane as Joey Handler
 Richard Durden as Laurence Garner
 Dennis Burkley as Sheriff Marlon Tolette
 James Black as Maurice Boudreau
 Colin McFarlane as Remy

External links
 
 
 

1998 direct-to-video films
1998 films
1990s thriller drama films
American thriller drama films
American erotic thriller films
1980s English-language films
Direct-to-video erotic thriller films
Films set in New Orleans
Films shot in Luxembourg
Films shot in New Orleans
American independent films
Direct-to-video prequel films
Lionsgate films
Films produced by John Dunning
1998 drama films
1990s English-language films
1990s American films
American prequel films